The 1991–92 Arkansas Razorbacks men's basketball team represented the University of Arkansas in the 1991–92 college basketball season. The head coach was Nolan Richardson, serving for his seventh year. The team played its home games in Barnhill Arena in Fayetteville, Arkansas. In their first year of competition in the Southeastern Conference, Arkansas won the SEC West Division and SEC regular season championships. After beating Murray State in the first round of the NCAA Tournament, the Hogs were upset in the second round by Memphis State, led by Penny Hardaway.

Small forward Todd Day ended his college career as Arkansas' all-time leader in points scored for a career, surpassing former Razorback All-American Sidney Moncrief.

Roster

Schedule and results

|-
!colspan=12 style=| Regular season

|-
!colspan=12 style=| SEC Tournament

|-
!colspan=12 style=| NCAA Tournament

Sources

Rankings

Team players in the 1992 NBA draft

References

Arkansas
Arkansas
Arkansas Razorbacks men's basketball seasons
Razor
Razor